Adele Goldberg is the name of:

 Adele Goldberg (computer scientist) (born 1945), computer scientist who wrote or co-wrote books on the programming language Smalltalk-80
 Adele Goldberg (linguist) (born 1963), researcher in the field of linguistics